Lars Erik Pettersson (19 March 1925 – 8 May 1971) was a Swedish ice hockey and bandy player. He represented his country at the 1952 Winter Olympics. He won a bronze medal in the team competition and scored six goals.

References

1925 births
1971 deaths
AIK IF players
Ice hockey players at the 1952 Winter Olympics
Olympic bronze medalists for Sweden
Olympic ice hockey players of Sweden
Olympic medalists in ice hockey
Sportspeople from Västerås
Swedish ice hockey players
Medalists at the 1952 Winter Olympics
Swedish bandy players
Västerås SK Bandy players